Allan Campbell may refer to:

 Allan M. Campbell (1929–2018), American microbiologist and geneticist
 Allan Campbell (Canadian politician) (born 1969), member of the Legislative Assembly of Prince Edward Island
 Allan Campbell (Australian politician) (1836–1898), South Australian MLC and physician
 Allan Campbell (footballer) (born 1998), Scottish footballer

See also
 Alan Campbell (disambiguation)